Colonel Gray Sr. High School (CGHS), colloquially referred to as "The Gray", is a Canadian secondary school in Charlottetown, Prince Edward Island. Its zone includes students from the central parts of Queens County, in the City of Charlottetown.

The school is administratively part of the Public Schools Branch. Its official colours are Burgundy and Gray and the mascot is a Colonel. The sports teams from "The Gray" are called the Colonel Gray Colonels.

History and characteristics
In 1966 Colonel Gray opened, named after Colonel John Hamilton Gray, former Premier of Prince Edward Island (1863–1865) and chairman of the Confederation conference of 1864.
In 2008, Colonel Gray received a $40,000 HP grant to improve teaching by using technology. The grant was used to enhance teaching math and science at The Gray.
In 2009, Colonel Gray High School became an IB World School offering the IB Diploma Programme to students.

IB Subjects Offered: 
 Biology Higher Level
 English A1 Higher Level
 History Higher Level
 Chemistry Standard Level
 French B Standard Level
 French Ab Initio Standard Level
 Math Standard Level
 Visual Arts Standard Level

The school has 80 staff members who offer instruction in grades 10, 11 and 12 for approximately 1000 students. The high school offers both French and English-language instruction and the International Baccalaureate Diploma Programme.

Facilities
 Over one hundred classrooms most of which contain Smart Boards
 A chemistry lab
 A biology lab
 An automotive shop
 A carpentry shop
 A Student Council office for Student Event planning
 A kitchen used to supply many in-school events or public speakers or organizations visiting the high school
 A lecture theatre
 Four computer labs
 A library
 A gymnasium with a fitness centre
 Cafeteria
 Specialist instruction space

School sports

Sports at Colonel Gray today
Colonel Gray is home to many sports. Colonel Gray has fields for the following sports: field hockey, soccer/rugby and softball. The fields are shared with Simmons Sports Arena and Queen Charlotte Intermediate School which are both within walking distance. The school is also within walking distance of the Victoria Park tennis courts, outdoor pool, and baseball fields.

Sports offered at Colonel Gray include:

boys and girls basketball
boys and girls rugby
boys and girls soccer
boys and girls track and field
boys and girls volleyball
boys and girls softball
girls field hockey
boys and girls badminton
boys and girls cross country
boys and girls golf
boys and girls wrestling
boys and girls mud wrestling

Sports tournaments

The Wall of Fame Cup
A men's and women's volleyball and soccer tournament hosted in October. Each year several notable Colonel Gray alumni athletes are inducted into the Colonel Gray Wall of Fame at a Dinner hosted at the Holland College Culinary Center.

The Colonel Gray Classic
A Women's basketball tournament hosted in early December by Colonel Gray High which draws schools competing from across the Maritime provinces.

The Gray Cup
A Men's basketball tournament hosted in early December by Colonel Gray High which draws schools competing from across the Maritime provinces.

Intramurals
 Major League Dodgeball Association (run by the Student Council)
 Colonel Gray Ball Hockey Association (run by the Student Council)
 Speed Ball Tournament (run by Colonel Gray Leadership Club)

Notable alumni
 Robert Ghiz, former Premier of Prince Edward Island
 Martha MacIsaac, Canadian actress
 Clifford Lee, former mayor of Charlottetown, Prince Edward Island
 Heather Morrison, Chief public health officer of Prince Edward Island

See also
List of schools in Prince Edward Island
List of school districts in Prince Edward Island

References

External links
 Home Page

High schools in Prince Edward Island
Schools in Charlottetown
International Baccalaureate schools in Prince Edward Island
Educational institutions established in 1968
1968 establishments in Prince Edward Island